Oğuz Dağlaroğlu (born 18 August 1979 in Istanbul) is a Turkish professional footballer who last played as a goalkeeper for Turkish club Sarıyer.

References

 Adana Demirspor Oğuz Dağlaroğlu'nu serbest bıraktı, haberturk.com, 16 December 2015

External links 
 
 
 
 

1979 births
Living people
Footballers from Istanbul
Fenerbahçe S.K. footballers
Gaziantepspor footballers
Kartalspor footballers
Akhisarspor footballers
Süper Lig players
İstanbulspor footballers
Diyarbakırspor footballers
Sivasspor footballers
Şanlıurfaspor footballers
TKİ Tavşanlı Linyitspor footballers
Turkey youth international footballers
Turkey under-21 international footballers
Association football goalkeepers
Sarıyer S.K. footballers
Adana Demirspor footballers
Turkish footballers